Montgomery County may refer to:

Australia
 The former name of Montgomery Land District, Tasmania

United Kingdom
 The historic county of Montgomeryshire, Wales, also called County of Montgomery

United States
 Montgomery County, Alabama
 Montgomery County, Arkansas
 Montgomery County, Georgia 
 Montgomery County, Illinois 
 Montgomery County, Indiana
 Montgomery County, Iowa
 Montgomery County, Kansas 
 Montgomery County, Kentucky
 Montgomery County, Maryland
 Montgomery County, Mississippi
 Montgomery County, Missouri 
 Montgomery County, New York 
 Montgomery County, North Carolina 
 Montgomery County, Ohio
 Montgomery County, Pennsylvania
 Montgomery County, Tennessee
 Montgomery County, Texas
 Montgomery County, Virginia